Geçitköy may refer to:

 Geçitköy, Çüngüş
 Geçitköy, Elmalı
 Geçitköy Dam